Trichauxa is a genus of longhorn beetles of the subfamily Lamiinae, containing the following species:

 Trichauxa albovittata Breuning, 1966
 Trichauxa fusca Breuning, 1957

References

Desmiphorini